Richard Hernando Alonzo is a Filipino professional basketball player for the Muntinlupa Cagers of the Maharlika Pilipinas Basketball League (MPBL).

He was an undrafted player signed by the Purefoods Tender Juicy Giants in 2008 before being traded to Burger King. Burger King traded Richard Alonzo to Barako Bull for Carlo Sharma.

In 2015, Alonzo was signed by the Pacquiao Powervit Pilipinas Aguilas (later the Pilipinas MX3 Kings) of the ASEAN Basketball League (ABL) as one of the team's local players after being left unsigned by Kia. However, in December 2015, Alonzo, along with Emmerson Oreta, Charles Mammie, Sunday Salvacion, Jondan Salvador, and Adrian Celada were released by the Pilipinas MX3 Kings after a roster overhaul.

References

1983 births
Living people
Power forwards (basketball)
Magnolia Hotshots players
Small forwards
Adamson Soaring Falcons basketball players
Philippines men's national basketball team players
Filipino men's basketball players
People from Caloocan
Basketball players from Metro Manila
Barako Bull Energy players
Barako Bull Energy Boosters players
NorthPort Batang Pier players
Terrafirma Dyip players
Southeast Asian Games gold medalists for the Philippines
Southeast Asian Games competitors for the Philippines
Southeast Asian Games medalists in basketball
Maharlika Pilipinas Basketball League players
Competitors at the 2007 Southeast Asian Games
Filipino expatriate basketball people in Thailand